Mehran County is in Ilam province, Iran. The capital of the county is the city of Mehran. At the 2006 census, the county's population was 55,271 in 10,960 households. The following census in 2011 counted 27,506 people in 6,884 households, by which time Malekshahi District had been separated from the county to form Malekshahi County. At the 2016 census, the county's population was 29,797 in 8,471 households.

Administrative divisions

The population history and structural changes of Mehran County's administrative divisions over three consecutive censuses are shown in the following table. The latest census shows two districts, two rural districts, and two cities.

References

 

Counties of Ilam Province